Masatsugu (written: , , , , , , , ,  and ) is a masculine Japanese given name. Notable people with the name include:

, Japanese daimyō
, Japanese samurai
, Japanese warrior
, Japanese daimyō
, Japanese samurai
, Japanese boxer
, Japanese golfer
, Japanese noble
, Japanese writer
Masatsugu Suzuki, Japanese-American physicist
, Japanese samurai
, Japanese sumo wrestler

Japanese masculine given names